Wee-Lek Chew (born 1932) is a Singaporean-born botanist.

Career
Chew was born in Singapore in 1932. He did his B.S. in botany at the University of Malaya under Richard Eric Holttum, and following his graduation in 1956 he began working at the Singapore Botanic Gardens. A year later he went to the United Kingdom on a Singapore government fellowship to pursue a Ph.D. at the University of Cambridge, where his advisor was E. J. H. Corner. He completed his studies in 1960, and returned to the Singapore Botanic Gardens that year. He further received a postdoctoral fellowship in 1964. He became the director and ex officio chairman of the Board of Trustees of the Singapore Botanic Gardens in 1969 following the retirement of H. M. Burkill. He resigned the following year and moved to Australia to work at the Royal Botanic Garden, Sydney, and was succeeded as director by A. G. Alphonso. He was named a fellow of the Linnean Society of London in 1974. In 1975 he resigned from his post at the National Herbarium of New South Wales to take up a position with the International Union for Conservation of Nature in Morges, Switzerland. He revised the Australian species in the genus Ficus in 1989 for the Flora of Australia.

Works

References

1932 births
Living people
Singaporean expatriates in the United Kingdom
University of Malaya alumni
Alumni of the University of Cambridge
Singaporean botanists
Fellows of the Linnean Society of London
Singaporean expatriates in Australia
Singaporean expatriates in Switzerland